An identikit is a graphical representation of one or more eyewitnesses' memory of a face, as recorded by a composite artist.

Identikit may also refer to:

 Identikit, alternate title of the 1974 Italian drama film The Driver's Seat
 "Identikit", a 2016 song by Radiohead from the album A Moon Shaped Pool